NESFA Press is the publishing arm of the New England Science Fiction Association, Inc. The NESFA Press primarily produces three types of books:

 Books honoring the guest(s) of honor at their annual convention, Boskone, and at some Worldcons and other conventions. 
 Books in the NESFA's Choice series, which bring back into print the works of deserving classic SF writers such as James Schmitz, Cordwainer Smith, C. M. Kornbluth, and Zenna Henderson. 
 Reference books on science fiction and science fiction fandom.

Works published by NESFA Press
This is a reverse chronological list of books published by NESFA Press.

2020s

2020
 Stan's Kitchen by Kim Stanley Robinson
 Believing by Zenna Henderson

2010s

2019
 On the Road with Gardner Dozois by Gardner Dozois
 From These Ashes by Fredric Brown
 Ingathering by Zenna Henderson
 Transfinite by A. E. van Vogt
 The Immortal Storm by Sam Moskowitz

2018
 Making Conversation by Teresa Nielsen Hayden
 Making Book by Teresa Nielsen Hayden
 Dreamweaver’s Dilemma by Lois McMaster Bujold
 Power & Light by Roger Zelazny 
 The Rediscovery of Man by Cordwainer Smith

2017
 The Halcyon Fairy Book by T. Kingfisher
 A Lit Fuse: The Provocative Life of Harlan Ellison by Nat Segaloff
Question and Answer by Poul Anderson

2016
 The Grimm Future edited by Erin Underwood
 Call Me Joe  by Poul Anderson
Conspiracy! ed. by Thomas A. Easton & Judith Klein-Dial

2015
 The Ides of Octember: A Pictorial Bibliography of Roger Zelazny by Christopher S. Kovacs

2014
 A Bicycle Built for Brew by Poul Anderson

2013
 Door to Anywhere by Poul Anderson
 Last Exit to Babylon by Roger Zelazny
 The Road to Amber by Roger Zelazny

2012
 24 Frames into the Future: Scalzi on Science Fiction Films by John Scalzi 	
 Barrayar by Lois McMaster Bujold

2011
 Lifelode by Jo Walton
 This Mortal Mountain by Roger Zelazny
 Scratch Monkey by Charles Stross
Admiralty, by Poul Anderson

2010
 Deep Navigation by Alastair Reynolds
 The Vor Game, by Lois McMaster Bujold
 Robots and Magic, by Lester del Rey
 The Saturn Game, by Poul Anderson
 The Ides of Octember: A Pictorial Bibliography of Roger Zelazny, by Christopher S. Kovacs

2000s

2009
 Nine Black Doves, by Roger Zelazny
 The Road to Amber, by Roger Zelazny
 The Flight of Eagles by James Blish
 War and Space, by Lester del Rey
 The Queen of Air and Darkness, by Poul Anderson
 Magic Mirrors, by John Bellairs
 This Mortal Mountain, by Roger Zelazny
 Last Exit to Babylon, by Roger Zelazny
 Lifelode, by Jo Walton
 Sibyls and Spaceships, by Jo Walton
 Threshold, by Roger Zelazny
 Power and Light, by Roger Zelazny
 Call Me Joe, by Poul Anderson

2008
 Brothers in Arms, by Lois McMaster Bujold
 Spaced Out (omnibus), by Judith Merril & C.M. Kornbluth
 The One Right Thing, by Bruce Coville
 Works of Art, by James Blish
 From Other Shores, by Chad Oliver

2007
 Borders of Infinity, by Lois McMaster Bujold
 The Involuntary Human, by David Gerrold
 The Mathematics of Magic: The Enchanter Stories of L. Sprague de Camp and Fletcher Pratt, by L. Sprague de Camp and Fletcher Pratt

2006
 Giant Lizards from Another Star, by Ken MacLeod

2005
 The Masque of Mañana, by Robert Sheckley
 Once Upon a Time (She Said), by Jane Yolen
 Years in the Making: the Time-Travel Stories of L. Sprague de Camp, by L. Sprague de Camp
 Homecalling and Other Stories, by Judith Merril

2004
 All Our Yesterdays, by Harry Warner, Jr.
 Dancing Naked: The Unexpurgated William Tenn, by William Tenn
 Falling Free, by Lois McMaster Bujold
 With Stars in My Eyes: My Adventures in British Fandom, by Peter Weston
 Fancestral Voices, by Jack Speer
 Once More* With Footnotes, by Terry Pratchett
 "Doc"—First Galactic Roamer: A complete Bibliography and Publishing Checklist of Book and Articles by and About E. E. "Doc" Smith, by Stephen C. Lucchetti
 The Hunters of Pangaea, by Stephen Baxter
 Powers of Two, by Tim Powers
 Silverlock: Including the Silverlock Companion, by John Myers Myers (1949) and Fred Lerner, ed. (1988)

2003
 Ethan of Athos, by Lois McMaster Bujold
 Rivets!!! The Science Fiction Musicals of Mark Keller and Sue Anderson, by Mark Keller & Sue Anderson
 A Star Above It and Other Stories, by Chad Oliver
 Far From This Earth and Other Stories, by Chad Oliver
 Transfinite: The Essential A. E. van Vogt, by A. E. van Vogt
 Tomorrow Happens, by David Brin
 A New Dawn, the Don A. Stuart Stories of John W. Campbell, Jr., by John W. Campbell, Jr.

2002
 Martians and Madness: The SF Novels of Fredric Brown, by Fredric Brown
 Cybele, with Bluebonnets, by Charles L. Harness
 The Warrior's Apprentice, by Lois McMaster Bujold
 Expecting Beowulf, by Tom Holt
 Adventures in The Dream Trade, by Neil Gaiman
 Dimensions of Sheckley, by Robert Sheckley

2001
 Robert Silverberg Presents the Great SF (1964) selected by Robert Silverberg & Martin H. Greenberg
 Entities, by Eric Frank Russell
 Strange Days: Fabulous Journeys with Gardner Dozois, by Gardner R. Dozois
 Here Comes Civilization: The Complete Science Fiction of William Tenn, Volume 2, by William Tenn
 From These Ashes: The Short Science Fiction of Fredric Brown, by Fredric Brown
 Immodest Proposals: The Complete Science Fiction of William Tenn, Volume 1, by William Tenn
 Quartet, by George R. R. Martin

2000
 The Essential Hal Clement, Volume 3: Variations on a Theme by Sir Isaac Newton. The Mesklin Writings of Hal Clement, by Hal Clement
 Major Ingredients, by Eric Frank Russell
 Concordance to Cordwainer Smith, Anthony R. Lewis
 Shards of Honor, by Lois McMaster Bujold
 The Essential Hal Clement, Volume 2: Music of Many Spheres. Selected Short Fiction of Hal Clement, by Hal Clement
 Moon Dogs, by Michael Swanwick

1990s

1999
 Rings, by Charles Harness
 Another Part of the Trilogy, a libretto by John M. Ford
 The Essential Hal Clement, Volume 1: Trio for Slide Rule and Typewriter. Three Science Fiction Novels of Hal Clement, by Hal Clement
 Double Feature, Emma Bull and Will Shetterly
 The Compleat Boucher: The Science Fiction of Anthony Boucher, by Anthony Boucher

1998
 First Contacts: The Essential Murray Leinster, by Murray Leinster
 The Work of Jack Williamson: An Annotated Bibliography and Guide, by Richard Hauptmann
 An Ornament to His Profession, by Charles L. Harness
 Frankensteins and Foreign Devils, by Walter Jon Williams

1997
 The Armor of Light, by Melissa Scott & Lisa A. Barnett
 Entertainment, by Algis Budrys
 From the End of The Twentieth Century, by John M. Ford
 His Share of Glory: The Complete Short Science Fiction of C. M. Kornbluth, by C. M. Kornbluth

1996
 The White Papers, by James White
 The Silence of The Langford, by Dave Langford
 Dreamweaver's Dilemma, by Lois McMaster Bujold

1995
 Ingathering: The Complete People Stories, by Zenna Henderson
 Everard's Ride, by Diana Wynne Jones
 Andre Norton, A Primary and Secondary Bibliography, 2nd Revised Edition, by Roger C. Schlobin & Irene R. Harrison
 A Bookman's Fantasy: How Science Fiction Became Respectable, and Other Essays, by Fred Lerner
 Norstrilia, by Cordwainer Smith

1994
 The Passage of The Light: The Recursive Science Fiction of Barry N. Malzberg, by Barry N. Malzberg
 Making Book, by Teresa Nielsen Hayden
 Double Feature, by Will Shetterly & Emma Bull

1993
 The Rediscovery of Man: The Complete Short Science Fiction of Cordwainer Smith, by Cordwainer Smith
 Vietnam and Other Alien Worlds, by Joe Haldeman

1992
 Storyteller, by Jane Yolen
 Let's Hear it for the Deaf Man, by Dave Langford

1991
 The Best of James H. Schmitz, by James H. Schmitz
 Stalking the Wild Resnick, by Mike Resnick

1990
 An Annotated Bibliography of Recursive Science Fiction, by Anthony R. Lewis
 Sung in Blood, by Glen Cook

1980s

1989
 Grand Masters' Choice, edited by Andre Norton & Ingrid Zierhut
 An Epitaph in Rust, by Tim Powers

1988
 Up There and Other Strange Directions, by Donald A. Wollheim
 Early Harvest, by Greg Bear

1987
 The NESFA Hymnal, Volume 2
 If I Ran the Zoo Con... (2nd edition), by Leslie J. Turek
 Intuit, by Hal Clement
 Glass and Amber, by C. J. Cherryh

1986
 Between Two Worlds, by Terry Carr & Messages Found in an Oxygen Bottle, by Bob Shaw
 Out of My Head, by Robert Bloch

1985
 Light from a Lone Star, by Jack Vance
 Late Knight Edition, by Damon Knight

1984
 Concordance to Cordwainer Smith, by Anthony R. Lewis
 Dickson!, by Gordon R. Dickson
 Plan[e]t Engineering, by Gene Wolfe

1983
 A New Settlement of Old Scores, by John Brunner
 Compounded Interests, by Mack Reynolds

1982
 Up to the Sky in Ships, by A. Bertram Chandler & In and Out of Quandry, by Lee Hoffman
 The Men from Ariel, by Donald A. Wollheim

1981
 Unsilent Night, by Tanith Lee

1970s

1979
 The NESFA Hymnal

1978
 Tomorrow May Be Even Worse, by John Brunner

1977
 Viewpoint, by Ben Bova

1976
 Homebrew, by Poul Anderson

1975
 A Time When, by Anne McCaffrey

1974
 Have You Seen These?, by Isaac Asimov

1973
 Three Faces of Science Fiction, by Robert A.W. Lowndes

1972
 Scribblings, by L. Sprague de Camp

1971
 Index to the Science Fiction Magazines 1966-1970, by Anthony Lewis

Authors published by NESFA Press

 Poul Anderson
 Isaac Asimov
 Melissa Scott & Lisa A. Barnett
 Stephen Baxter
 Greg Bear
 John Bellairs
 Robert Bloch
 Anthony Boucher
 Ben Bova
 David Brin
 Fredric Brown
 John Brunner
 Algis Budrys
 Lois McMaster Bujold
 Emma Bull & Will Shetterly
 John W. Campbell, Jr.
 Terry Carr & Bob Shaw
 A. Bertram Chandler & Lee Hoffman
 C. J. Cherryh
 Hal Clement
 Glen Cook
 L. Sprague de Camp
 Gordon R. Dickson
 Gardner R. Dozois
 John M. Ford
 Neil Gaiman
 David Gerrold
 Joe Haldeman
 Charles L. Harness
 Zenna Henderson
 Lee Hoffman & A. Bertram Chandler
 Tom Holt
 Diana Wynne Jones
 Damon Knight
 C. M. Kornbluth
 Dave Langford
 Tanith Lee
 Murray Leinster
 Fred Lerner
 Robert A. W. Lowndes
 Stephen C. Lucchetti
 Ken MacLeod
 Barry N. Malzberg
 George R. R. Martin
 Anne McCaffrey
 Judith Merril
 John Myers Myers
 Teresa Nielsen Hayden
 Andre Norton & Ingrid T. Zierhut
 Chad Oliver
 Tim Powers
 Terry Pratchett
 Fletcher Pratt
 Mike Resnick
 Mack Reynolds
 Eric Frank Russell
 James H. Schmitz
 Robert Sheckley
 Cordwainer Smith
 Jack Speer
 Michael Swanwick
 William Tenn
 A. E. van Vogt
 Jack Vance
 Harry Warner, Jr.
 Peter Weston
 James White
 Walter Jon Williams
 Gene Wolfe
 Donald A. Wollheim
 Jane Yolen

References

External links

NESFA Press website
NESFA
Boskone

American speculative fiction publishers
Book publishing companies based in Massachusetts
Small press publishing companies
Science fiction organizations
Science fiction publishers